Harold Selwyn Smith (July 19, 1922 – August 24, 2013) was an American jurist and politician who served as a member of the Senate of Virginia and as Virginia's Secretary of Public Safety. He resigned the latter position effective July 1, 1980 to take up a position on a Virginia Circuit Court. He died in Manassas Virginia at age 91

References

External links

1922 births
2013 deaths
State cabinet secretaries of Virginia
Virginia circuit court judges
University of Virginia School of Law alumni
Democratic Party Virginia state senators
Virginia Tech alumni
People from Manassas, Virginia
20th-century American judges